Aquaporin-2 (AQP-2) is found in the apical cell membranes of the kidney's collecting duct principal cells and in intracellular vesicles located throughout the cell. It is encoded by the  gene.

Regulation 

It is the only aquaporin regulated by vasopressin.
The basic job of aquaporin 2 is to reabsorb water from the urine while its being removed from the blood by the kidney.  Aquaporin 2 is in kidney epithelial cells and usually lies dormant in intracellular vesicle membranes. When it is needed, vasopressin binds to the cell surface vasopressin receptor thereby activating a signaling pathway that causes the aquaporin 2 containing vesicles to fuse with the plasma membrane, so the aquaporin 2 can be used by the cell.
This aquaporin is regulated in two ways by the peptide hormone vasopressin: 
 short-term regulation (minutes) through trafficking of AQP2 vesicles to the apical region where they fuse with the apical plasma membrane
 long-term regulation (days) through an increase in AQP2 gene expression.

This aquaporin is also regulated by food intake. Fasting reduces expression of this aquaporin independently of vasopressin.

Clinical significance 

Mutations in this channel are associated with nephrogenic diabetes insipidus, which can be autosomal dominant or recessive. Mutations in the vasopressin receptor cause a similar X-linked phenotype.

Lithium, which is often used to treat bipolar disorder, can cause acquired diabetes insipidus (characterized by the excretion of large volumes of dilute urine) by decreasing the expression of the AQP2 gene.

The expression of the AQP2 gene is increased during conditions associated with water retention such as pregnancy and congestive heart failure.

See also 
 Aquaporin

References

Further reading

External links 
  GeneReviews/NCBI/NIH/UW entry on Nephrogenic Diabetes Insipidus
 
 
 

Integral membrane proteins
Biology of bipolar disorder